Globulina is a genus of Foraminifera with an ovate to globular test, included in the Polymorphinidae, Notocariacea, that has been extant since the Middle Jurassic (Callovian).

The test, (or shell), is of translucent,  perforate, optically radial calcite. The surface smooth or rarely spinose to striate. Chambers are added at first in five planes, a little more than 144 deg. apart, as with the miliolid Quinqueloculina, but spiraling around the long axis; later chambers reduced to only three planes. Chambers are strongly overlapping; sutures oblique, flush to slightly depressed. Aperture terminal.

References 

 A. R. Loeblich and H. Tappan, 1964. Sarcodina Chiefly "Thecamoebians" and Foraminiferida; Treatise on Invertebrate Paleontology, Part C Protista 2. Geological Society of America and University of Kansas Press.
 A.R. Loeblich & H. Tappan,1988. Forminiferal Genera and their Classification. (E-book) 

Foraminifera genera
Middle Jurassic animals
Extant Middle Jurassic first appearances
Callovian genus first appearances